Febronia is a female given name. It may refer to
 Saint Febronia of Nisibis
 Saint Febronia of Syria
 Saint Fevronia of Murom
 a character in the Xenosaga series

ru:Феврония